Edmund Eli Wood (10 February 1903 – 1 June 1986) was an English professional footballer who made 60 appearances in the Football League playing for Northampton Town, Birmingham and Newcastle United. He played as a centre half.

Wood was born in Stirchley, which was then in Worcestershire and became part of Birmingham in 1911, and played for Redditch and Rhyl Athletic before joining Northampton Town. He played 50 games in the Third Division South for Northampton, then moved to First Division club Birmingham in 1925, where he played only one first-team game. After another spell with Rhyl Wood returned to the First Division to play nine times for Newcastle United before going back to Rhyl yet again. He died in Northampton in 1986 at the age of 83.

He was the nephew of another Edmund Wood, also a footballer, who was awarded a medal in the 1901-1902 West Bromwich Charity Cup.

References

1903 births
1986 deaths
People from Kings Norton
English footballers
Association football defenders
Redditch United F.C. players
Rhyl F.C. players
Northampton Town F.C. players
Birmingham City F.C. players
Newcastle United F.C. players
English Football League players